Sir Laurence Barton Grafftey-Smith (16 April 1892 – 3 January 1989) was a member of the British Consular Service from 1916 to 1947.

His grandson was musician Toby Smith.

Early life
Born to parents Revd. Arthur Grafftey-Smith and Mabel Grafftey-Smith (née Barton), he was educated Clifton College, Repton School and Pembroke College, Cambridge.

Career
His posts included being the British High Commissioner in Karachi, Pakistan (1947–1949). During his tenure, “he warned Pakistani Foreign Minister Sir Zafarullah Khan that an upcoming visit to Moscow (by invitation) would be seen with mistrust by Americans and the British. Prime Minister of Pakistan Liaquat Ali Khan later cancelled the visit.” He was Consul-General to Madagascar, Envoy Extraordinary and Minister Plenipotentiary at Jeddah (from 20 October 1945). He was appointed Knight Commander, Order of the British Empire (K.B.E.) and Knight Commander, Order of St. Michael and St. George (K.C.M.G.). In 1970 he published his memoirs of his time in the Middle East, under the title Bright Levant (London, John Murray, 1970). His book includes interesting description of his friendship with King Abdul Aziz Ibn Sa'ud in the early days of his reign, before Saudi Arabia came into its oil wealth.

References

1892 births
1989 deaths
Alumni of Pembroke College, Cambridge
People educated at Clifton College
High Commissioners of the United Kingdom to Pakistan
Knights Commander of the Order of the British Empire
Knights Commander of the Order of St Michael and St George